Amie Siegel (born 1974) is an American artist. She was awarded a Guggenheim Fellowship in 2007. Siegel was born in Chicago, Illinois. She attended Bard College and the School of the Art Institute of Chicago.

Recent exhibitions
Provenance – Simon Preston Gallery, New York, 2013
Metropolitan Museum of Art, New York, 2013
Ricochet – Kunstmuseum Stuttgart, Stuttgart, 2016
Swiss Institute Contemporary Art New York, 2016
Winter – Guggenheim Museum Bilbao, Bilbao, 2017
Gwangju Biennale, 2018
Backstory – Thomas Dane Gallery, London, 2018
Provenance – Tate St. Ives, St. Ives, 2019

Collections

Whitney Museum of American Art
Guggenheim Museum
Museum of Modern Art
Tate Modern

Festivals

Cannes Film Festival
Berlin International Film Festival

Awards

DAAD Berliner-Künstlerprogramm 
Creative Capital 
Harvard Film Study Center 
ICA Boston Foster Prize 
Guggenheim Fellowship, 2007

References

Living people
Filmmakers from Illinois
21st-century American artists
21st-century American women artists
1974 births